Robert Prier is a Canadian ice hockey former player and head coach who is noted for his brief tenure with the men's program at Princeton.

Career
Prier began his college career in 1995 after finishing second in the CJHL in scoring the year before. Prier continued his scoring at the college level, leading St. Lawrence in goals his junior season. In his senior season he led the team in goals and points while the Saints made their first NCAA appearance in seven years. After graduating with a degree in economics Prier had a 3-game career as a professional with the Pee Dee Pride before retiring as a player.

The same year Prier was hired by his former junior team as an assistant coach but quickly jumped back to the college ranks the following year. He spent one year at both Denver and Princeton before signing on with his alma mater in 2002. Prier spent two years as an assistant and another seven as associate head coach before he was offered the top position with Princeton in 2011. Prier's first two seasons with the Tigers ended with poor but respectable records but his third saw the tigers finish last in the ECAC. Prier resigned after the season and it was reported that he had done so under pressure from outgoing athletic director Gary Walters.

College Head Coaching record

References

External links

1976 births
Living people
Ice hockey people from Ottawa
St. Lawrence Saints men's ice hockey players
Pee Dee Pride players
Princeton Tigers men's ice hockey coaches
Boston Bruins draft picks
Canadian ice hockey forwards